Miracle in the Andes (in Spanish "Milagro en los Andes") is a 2006 non-fiction account of a rugby team's survival on a glacier in the Andes for 72 days by survivor Nando Parrado and co-author Vince Rause. It was published by Crown.

Story

Nando Parrado co-wrote the 2006 book Miracle in the Andes: 72 Days on the Mountain and My Long Trek Home, with Vince Rause. In Miracle in the Andes, Nando Parrado returns to the events described in Piers Paul Read's 1974 book, Alive: The Story of the Andes Survivors (which tells the story of the people, most of whom were part of a Uruguayan rugby team consisting of alumni of Stella Maris College (Montevideo), who were on Uruguayan Air Force Flight 571, which crashed into the Andes mountains on October 13, 1972). When what little food they had ran out after ten days, those still alive agreed that after their death the others should eat their bodies to survive.

Piers Paul Read's version was published two years after the rescue and was based upon interviews with the survivors. Miracle of the Andes, however, is told from Nando Parrado's point of view 34 years later.

Reception
Publishers Weekly wrote that it is "more than a companion to the 1970s best-selling chronicle of the disaster, Alive: The Story of the Andes Survivors, this is a fresh, gripping page-turner that will satisfy adventure readers, and a complex reflection on camaraderie, family and love."  The Library Journal found the book to be, "more introspective than Piers Paul Read's journalistic account, Alive: The Story of the Andes Survivors...Parrado presents both the jaw-dropping realities of the 16 survivors' story and the life-altering lessons he learned from the experience" .
Jon Krakauer, the author of Into Thin Air, said the book is "an astonishing account of an unimaginable ordeal".

Popular culture 
Musician Adam Young, of Owl City, composed a score inspired by the book and released for free on July 1, 2016.

See also
 Alive: The Miracle of the Andes
Alive: 20 Years Later
Uruguayan Air Force Flight 571

Notes

External links
Powell's review
Book Excerpt

Non-fiction books about cannibalism
2006 non-fiction books
Uruguayan Air Force Flight 571
Collaborative non-fiction books
Uruguayan biographies